Ralph Adams Cram (December 16, 1863 – September 22, 1942) was a prolific and influential American architect of collegiate and ecclesiastical buildings, often in the Gothic Revival style. Cram & Ferguson and Cram, Goodhue & Ferguson are partnerships in which he worked. Cram was a fellow of the American Institute of Architects.

Early life
Cram was born on December 16, 1863, at Hampton Falls, New Hampshire, to William Augustine and Sarah Elizabeth Cram. He was educated at Augusta, Hampton Falls, Westford Academy, which he entered in 1875, and Phillips Exeter Academy.He was a cousin of Ralph Warren Cram.

At age 18, Cram moved to Boston in 1881 and worked for five years in the architectural office of Rotch & Tilden, after which he left for Rome to study classical architecture. From 1885 to 1887, he was art critic for the Boston Transcript. During an 1887 Christmas Eve mass in Rome, he had a dramatic conversion experience. For the rest of his life, he practiced as a fervent Anglo-Catholic who identified as high-church Anglican.  In the 1890s, Cram was a key figure in "social-controversial-inspirational" groups including the Pewter Mugs and the Visionists.

In 1900, Cram married Elizabeth Carrington Read at New Bedford, Massachusetts. She was the daughter of Clement Carrington Read and his wife. Read had served as a captain in the Confederate Army during the American Civil War. Elizabeth and Ralph had three children, Mary Carrington Cram, Ralph Wentworth Cram and Elizabeth Strudwick Cram. The family burial site is at the St. Elizabeth's Memorial Churchyard. The churchyard is adjacent to St Elizabeth's Chapel, which Cram designed.

Career

Cram and business partner Charles Wentworth started business in Boston in April 1889 as Cram and Wentworth. They had landed only four or five church commissions before they were joined by Bertram Goodhue in 1892 to form Cram, Wentworth and Goodhue.  Goodhue brought an award-winning commission in Dallas (never built) and brilliant drafting skills to the Boston office.

Wentworth died in 1897 and the firm's name changed to Cram, Goodhue & Ferguson to include draftsman Frank Ferguson.  Cram and Goodhue complemented each other's strengths at first but began to compete, sometimes submitting two differing proposals for the same commission. The firm won design of the United States Military Academy at West Point in 1902, a major milestone in their career.  They set up the firm's New York office, where Goodhue would preside, leaving Cram to operate in Boston. He designed the sanctuary for the First Unitarian Society in Newton which represents elements of his signature ecclesiastical style and was built in 1905. From 1907 to 1909 Cram was the editor of Christian Art.

Cram's acceptance of the Cathedral of St. John the Divine commission in 1911 (on Goodhue's perceived territory) heightened the tension between the two. Architectural historians have attributed most of their projects to one partner or the other, based on the visual and compositional style, and the location. The Gothic Revival Saint Thomas Church was designed by them both in 1914 on Manhattan's Fifth Avenue. It is the last example of their collaboration, and the most integrated and strongest example of their work together.

Goodhue began his solo career on August 14, 1913. Cram and Ferguson continued with major church and college commissions through the 1930s.  Particularly important work includes the original campus of Rice University, Houston, as well as the library and first city hall of that city. Also notable is Cram's first church in the Boston area, All Saints, Dorchester. The successor firm is HDB/Cram and Ferguson of Boston.

A leading proponent of disciplined Gothic Revival architecture in general and Collegiate Gothic in particular, Cram is most closely associated with Princeton University, where he served as supervising architect from 1907 to 1929, during a period of major construction. The university awarded him a Doctor of Letters for his achievements. In 1907, he served as chairman of the American Institute of Architects' Committee on Education.

For seven years he headed the Architectural Department at Massachusetts Institute of Technology.  Through the 1920s Cram was a public figure and frequently mentioned in the press. The New York Times called him "one of the most prominent Episcopalian laymen in the country". His work was part of the architecture event in the art competition at the 1928 Summer Olympics.

He made news with his defense of Al Smith during his electoral campaign, when anti-Catholic rhetoric was used, saying "I... express my disgust at the ignorance and superstition now rampant and in order that I may go on record as another of those who, though not Roman Catholics, are nevertheless Americans and are outraged by this recrudescence of blatant bigotry, operating through the most cowardly and contemptible methods."

In around 1932, he designed the Desloge Chapel in St. Louis, MO, the Gothic chapel designed to echo the contours of the St. Chapelle in Paris. Desloge Chapel, which is associated with the Firmin Desloge Hospital and St. Louis University, in 1983, was declared a landmark by the Missouri Historical Society. In 1938, he was elected into the National Academy of Design as an Associate Academician.

Views

Modernism
As an author, lecturer, and architect, Cram propounded the view that the Renaissance had been, at least in part, an unfortunate detour for western culture. Cram argued that authentic development could come only by returning to Gothic sources for inspiration, as his "Collegiate Gothic" architecture did, with considerable success. For his Rice University buildings, he favored a medieval north Italian Romanesque style, more in keeping with Houston's hot, humid climate.

A modernist in many ways, he designed Art Deco landmarks of great distinction, including the Federal Building skyscraper in Boston and numerous churches. For example, his design of the tower of the East Liberty Presbyterian Church, Pittsburgh, was inspired by the Empire State Building. His work at Rice was as modernist as medieval in inspiration. His administration building, his secular masterwork, has been compared by Shand-Tucci to Frank Lloyd Wright's work, particularly in the way its dramatic horizontality reflects the surrounding prairies.

The architectural historian Sandy Isenstadt wrote in a review of Cram's biography that "... (modernist) disdain (of Cram) turned out to be modernism's loss".  Peter Cormack, director of London's William Morris Gallery, said regarding the critical neglect of Cram's work that it was "a phenomenon which has significantly distorted the study of America's modern architectural history... (Cram) deserves the same kind of international--and domestic--recognition accorded (all too often uncritically) to his contemporary Frank Lloyd Wright".

Politics
Cram argued that the United States would be better off under a constitutional monarchy. He lays out some of his monarchist beliefs in his work Invitation to Monarchy, which appeared in The American Mercury in 1936.

Religion
Raised Unitarian, Cram converted to Anglo-Catholicism after a youthful visit to Rome. He later joined The Episcopal Church in the United States upon returning to his home country. Throughout his life, Cram was devoted to liturgical and devotional practices revived by Anglo-Catholicism, including the cultus of King Charles the Martyr. He, along with other Anglo-Catholics, viewed Anglicanism as a "branch" of the one true Church, alongside the Roman Catholicism and Eastern Orthodoxy, and hoped for eventual unification with Rome.

Cram also co-founded the American branches of the Society of King Charles the Martyr and the Order of the White Rose. Traveling through Europe, Cram also befriended Catholic writers Hilaire Belloc and G.K. Chesterton, who have been accredited with influencing his views. He later became involved with a number of American Roman Catholic enterprises and co-founded the Catholic magazine Commonweal. Cram accepted papal primacy and frequently defended Catholicism against American anti-Catholic prejudice, though he never converted to the religion itself.

Selected works

Residences

The Birches, Garrison, New York, 1882
House of the Rising Sun, 657 Highland Avenue, Fall River, Massachusetts, 1890. Designed for Unitarian missionary Reverend Arthur May Knapp (1841–1921), it was inspired by a Japanese Pagoda.
Rehoboth, Chappaqua, New York, 1891–92
Richmond Court, Brookline, Massachusetts, 1896
Watkins Manor House, Winona, Minnesota, 1924–27
Moonstone Cottage, 559 York Street, York Harbor, Maine

Churches and religious buildings

All Saints' Church, Ashmont, Massachusetts, 1892
Christ Church, Hyde Park, Massachusetts 1892
Church of St. John the Evangelist, Boston, Massachusetts, 1892
Lady Chapel, Church of the Advent, Boston, Massachusetts, 1894
Phillips Church, Exeter, New Hampshire, 1897
All Saints Parish, Brookline, Massachusetts, 1898
Emmanuel Church, Newport, Rhode Island, 1900
Calvary Episcopal Church, Pittsburgh, Pennsylvania, 1904
Holy Cross Monastery, West Park, New York, with Henry Vaughan, 1904
All Saints' Chapel, Sewanee: The University of the South, Sewanee, Tennessee, begun 1904, completed 1959
La Santisima Trinidad pro-cathedral, Havana, Cuba, 1905
Saint Thomas Church, New York City, 1905–13
First Unitarian Society, Newton, Massachusetts, 1905–06
Westminster Presbyterian Church, Springfield, IL,  1906
St. Andrew's Episcopal Church, Denver, CO, 1907
Cathedral Church of Saint Paul, Detroit, Michigan, 1908
St. Philip's Church, Durham, North Carolina, 1908
Russell Sage Memorial Church, Far Rockaway, New York, 1908-10
House of Hope Presbyterian Church, St. Paul, Minnesota, 1909–14
St. Florian Church, Hamtramck, Michigan, 1910, expanded by Cram 1928
All Saints Cathedral, Halifax, Nova Scotia, 1910
Park Avenue Christian Church, New York City, 1911
Church of the Covenant in the University Circle neighborhood of Cleveland, Ohio, 1911
Cathedral of St. John the Divine, New York City, design taken over by Cram in 1911, unfinished
All Souls Congregational Church, Bangor, Maine, 1912
remodeling of Richard Upjohn's Grace Church, Providence, Rhode Island, 1912
Saint Paul's Episcopal Parish, Malden, Massachusetts, begun 1913, unfinished
Fourth Presbyterian Church, Chicago, Illinois, 1914
Nave extension and Lady Chapel of Trinity Church, Princeton, Princeton, New Jersey, 1914.
Chapel of St. Anne, Arlington, Massachusetts, 1915
Sacred Heart Cathedral, Dodge City, Kansas (1916)
All Saints Church, Peterborough, New Hampshire, ca 1916-20
First Universalist Church, Somerville, Massachusetts, 1916-23
Chapel of Mercersburg Academy, Mercersburg, Pennsylvania, 1916–28
Cole Memorial Chapel, Wheaton College, Norton, Massachusetts, 1917
Trinity Episcopal Church, Houston, Texas, 1919
Calvary Episcopal Church, Americus, Georgia 1919–21
St. Mark's Episcopal Pro-Cathedral, Hastings, Nebraska, 1921–29
Saint James Church, Lake Delaware, New York, 1922.
First Presbyterian Church, Lexington, Kentucky 1922
The First Presbyterian Church, Tacoma, Washington, 1923
Sacred Heart Church, Jersey City, New Jersey, 1923
St. James' Episcopal Church, New York City, rebuilt, 1924
First Presbyterian Church, Utica, New York, 1924
Pine Street Presbyterian Church, Harrisburg, Pennsylvania, 1926
Westminster Presbyterian Church, Dayton, Ohio 1926
First Presbyterian Church, Lincoln, Nebraska, 1925–27
Chapel at St. George's School, Newport, Rhode Island, 1928
Holy Rosary Roman Catholic Church, Pittsburgh, Pennsylvania, 1928
First Presbyterian Church, Glens Falls, New York, 1928
St. Paul's Episcopal Church, Winston-Salem, North Carolina, 1928
Concordia Lutheran Church, Louisville, Kentucky, 1930
Knowles Memorial Chapel, on the campus of Rollins College, Winter Park, Florida, 1931–32
Christ Church United Methodist, New York City, 1931–33
Chancel, Brown Memorial Presbyterian Church, Baltimore, Maryland, 1931
Cathedral of Hope, Pittsburgh, Pennsylvania, 1932–35
Christ Episcopal Church tower addition, Blacksburg Historic District, Blacksburg, Virginia, 1934
Conventual Church of St. Mary and St. John, Cambridge, Massachusetts, 1936
Monastery and chapel at the Society of St. John the Evangelist, Cambridge, Massachusetts, 1936
All Saints Episcopal Church, Winter Park, Florida, 1941

Libraries & academic buildings

Public Library, Fall River, Massachusetts 1899
Boston Public Library, Parker Hill Branch, Roxbury, Massachusetts 1931
Deborah Cook Sayles Public Library, Pawtucket, Rhode Island, 1899
The Mather School, Dorchester, Massachusetts, 1905
Hunt Memorial Library, Nashua, New Hampshire, 1906 
Sweet Briar College, Sweet Briar, Virginia, 1906–28 
Mary K. Benedict Hall
Fletcher Hall
Mary Harley Student Health and Counseling Center
Mary Helen Cochran Library 
Masters Hall, The Masters School, Dobbs Ferry, New York, 1921
Princeton University, Princeton, New Jersey, 1911–28
Princeton University Graduate College, 1911–13
Cleveland Tower, 1917 
Princeton University Chapel, 1928
Rothschild Memorial Archway, 1929-1930
Campbell Hall
McCormick Hall
University of Richmond, Richmond, Virginia, 1911–14
Ryland Hall, 
Jeter Hall
North Court
Williams College, Williamstown, Massachusetts, 1910–22
Chapin Hall
Stetson Hall
Phillips Exeter Academy, Exeter, New Hampshire
Academy Building, 1914
other buildings
Rice University, Houston, Texas, 1910–16
Lovett Hall (Administration Building)
Mechanical Laboratory
Campus master plan
Lucius Beebe Memorial Library, Wakefield, Massachusetts, 1922
The Choate School, Wallingford, Connecticut, 1924–28
St. Andrews Chapel (now Seymour St. John Chapel) 
Archbold Infirmary, 1928 (now Archbold House)
Julia Ideson Building of the Houston Public Library, Houston, Texas, 1926
Doheny Library, Campus of the University of Southern California, Los Angeles, 1931
Bell Tower, Dwight Morrow High School, Englewood, New Jersey, 1932
Saint Mary's Academy, Glens Falls, New York, 1932
Wheaton College (Massachusetts), Upper Campus
Sweet Briar College, Sweet Briar, Virginia, Campus
South Dining Hall, University of Notre Dame, South Bend, Indiana, 1927

Other buildings
Virginia War Memorial Carillon, Byrd Park, Richmond, Virginia, 1932
U.S. Post Office and Courthouse aka J.W. McCormack Post Office and Courthouse, Boston, Massachusetts, 1933
buildings at the Aisne-Marne American Cemetery and Memorial, Belleau, France, 1937
buildings at the Oise-Aisne American Cemetery and Memorial, Fère-en-Tardenois, Aisne department, France, c. 1937
New England Mutual Life Insurance Building, Boston, Massachusetts, 1941

Cram & Ferguson, after Cram's death
Berkeley Building, Boston, Massachusetts, 1947
Marsh Chapel of Boston University, Boston, Massachusetts, 1950
St. Luke's Methodist Church (Monticello, Iowa), 1950

Publications
Cram wrote numerous publications and books on issues in architecture and religious devotion. Titles include:

Impressions of Japanese Architecture, The Baker & Taylor Company, 1905
Heart of Europe, MacMillan & Co. London, 1916 325pgs.
The Substance of Gothic, Marshall Jones Company, Boston, 1917
Farm Houses Manor Houses Minor Chateaux Small Churches in Normandy and Brittany, The Architectural Book Publishing Company, Paul Wenzel and Maurice Krakow, 1917Sins Of The Fathers, Marshall Jones Company, Boston, 1918Gold, Frankincense, and Myrrh, 1919Walled Towns, Marshall Jones Company, Boston, 1919Towards the Great Peace, Marshall Jones Company, Boston, 1922My Life in Architecture, Little, Brown, and Company, Boston, 1936

Cram also wrote fiction. A number of his stories, notably "The Dead Valley", were published in a collection entitled Black Spirits and White (Stone & Kimball, 1895). The collection has been called "one of the undeniable classics of weird fiction". H. P. Lovecraft wrote, "In 'The Dead Valley' the eminent architect and mediævalist Ralph Adams Cram achieves a memorably potent degree of vague regional horror through subtleties of atmosphere and description."

Professional memberships
Cram was a
Fellow of the:
Boston Society of Architects.
American Institute of Architects.
North British Academy of Arts.
Royal Geographical Society of London.
American Academy of Arts and Sciences.
Member of the:
American Federation of Arts.
Architectural Association of London.
Member of the clubs
Puritan Club (Boston).
Century Association (New York).

See also
List of covers of Time magazine (1920s)

References

Further reading

External links
Held by the Department of Drawings & Archives, Avery Architectural & Fine Arts Library, Columbia University.

Why We Do Not Behave Like Human Beings, essay by Cram
Cram & Ferguson Architects
Book review of The Architecture of Ralph Adams Cram'' by Ethan Anthony

Cram & Ferguson Google Map

1863 births
1942 deaths
19th-century American architects
20th-century American architects
 
American neoclassical architects
Gothic Revival architects
American ecclesiastical architects
Architects of cathedrals
Architects of Roman Catholic churches
Architects from Boston
Architects from New Hampshire
Fellows of the American Academy of Arts and Sciences
National Academy of Design associates
Architecture of Phillips Exeter Academy
American Anglo-Catholics
American Episcopalians
American expatriates in Italy
People from Hampton Falls, New Hampshire
University of Notre Dame people
Fellows of the Medieval Academy of America
Contributors to the Catholic Encyclopedia
Olympic competitors in art competitions
American monarchists
Members of the American Academy of Arts and Letters